George Yule (born 20 March 1947) is a Scottish-American linguist. He is known for his works on pragmatics and discourse analysis.

Life
George Yule was born in Stirling, Scotland in 1947, and became an American citizen in 2000. He now lives in Hawai‘i. He studied at Edinburgh University, completing an M.A. in English Language and Literature (1969), M.Sc. in Applied Linguistics (1978), and a PhD in Linguistics (1981). In his early career, he taught English in Canada, Jamaica, Saudi Arabia and Scotland. After completing his doctorate, he taught linguistics and applied linguistics at the University of Edinburgh, University of Minnesota, Louisiana State University and the University of Hawaiʻi. His areas of specialization are Discourse Analysis (Brown and Yule, 1983a; Overstreet and Yule, 2021) and Pragmatics (Yule, 1979; 1996). He has also carried out research and published on task-based language teaching (Brown and Yule, 1983b; Brown, Anderson, Shillcock and Yule, 1984; Tarone and Yule, 1989; Yule, 1997) and English Grammar (Yule, 1998; 2006/2019). His best-known work is an introductory textbook about language (Yule, 1985/2020).

Selected publications
Brown, G. and G. Yule (1983a) Discourse Analysis Cambridge University Press
Brown, G. and G. Yule (1983b) Teaching the Spoken Language Cambridge University Press
Brown, G., A. Anderson, R. Shillcock and G. Yule (1984) Teaching Talk: Strategies for Production and Assessment Cambridge University Press
Overstreet, M. and G. Yule (2021) General Extenders The Forms and Functions of a New Linguistic Category Cambridge University Press
Tarone, E. and G. Yule (1989) Focus on the Language Learner Oxford University Press
Yule, G. (1979) Pragmatically controlled anaphora Lingua 49: 127-35
Yule, G. (1985/2020) The Study of Language (1st/7th editions) Cambridge University Press
Yule, G. (1996) Pragmatics Oxford University Press 
Yule, G. (1997) Referential Communication Tasks Lawrence Erlbaum
Yule, G. (1998) Explaining English Grammar Oxford University Press
Yule, G. (2006/2019) Oxford Practice Grammar Advanced (1st/Revised editions) Oxford University Press

References

1947 births
Living people
Linguists from England
Alumni of the University of Edinburgh
University of Minnesota faculty
Louisiana State University faculty
University of Hawaiʻi faculty
Applied linguists
Pragmaticists
Linguists of English
Academics of the University of Edinburgh